Vitaliy Parakhnevych (born 4 May 1969, in Donetsk, Ukraine, then Ukrainian SSR) is a retired Tajikistani footballer. He also held Ukrainian citizenship before 1996.

Career

International
In August 1997, the Tajikistani national team were to take 16 players to South Korea to face their national team, but due to missing passports, only 12 players traveled. As a result, the Tajikistan Football Federation called upon Parakhnevych and Valeri Sarychev who were currently playing in the Korean K League.

National team statistics

References

External links

 

1969 births
Living people
Footballers from Donetsk
Tajikistani people of Ukrainian descent
Association football forwards
Ukrainian footballers
Ukrainian expatriate footballers
Expatriate footballers in Russia
Expatriate footballers in South Korea
Tajikistani footballers
Tajikistan international footballers
Tajikistani expatriate footballers
Expatriate footballers in Japan
Expatriate footballers in Ukraine
FC Chornomorets Odesa players
FC Lokomotiv Moscow players
FC Naftovyk-Ukrnafta Okhtyrka players
FC Nyva Ternopil players
Jeonbuk Hyundai Motors players
Suwon Samsung Bluewings players
Shonan Bellmare players
FC Seoul players
Jeju United FC players
Ukrainian Premier League players
Russian Premier League players
K League 1 players
J2 League players
Ukrainian Cup top scorers